Stereomerus pachypezoides is a species of beetle in the family Cerambycidae. It was described by Melzer in 1934. It is known from Argentina, Brazil and Uruguay.

References

Desmiphorini
Beetles described in 1934